Macromia bellicosa is a species of dragonfly in the family Macromiidae. It is an endemic dragonfly and found only in Western Ghats in South India. It breeds in hill streams.

Description
It is a medium sized dragonfly with greenish eyes. Its thorax is metallic bluish-green marked with citron-yellow. There is a short humeral stripe, an oblique narrow stripe on mesepimeron, a narrow stripe on the posterior border of metepimeron, and a narrow stripe traversing the sinus. Abdomen is black, marked with citron-yellow. There is a broad basal annule on segment 2 separated from the base on mid-dorsum and laterally by two black spots. Segment 3 has a narrow annule and a large baso-lateral spot. Segments 4 to 6 have similar but gradually narrowing annules. Segment 7 has the basal half yellow. Segment 8 has a very narrow basal ring. Segments 9 and 10 are unmarked. Anal appendages are dark ochreous.

It can be distinguished from Macromia flavicincta by the restricted yellow markings here.

See also
 List of odonates of India
 List of odonata of Kerala

References

Macromiidae
Taxa named by Frederic Charles Fraser